Född i november is a 2010 studio album by Orup.

Track listing

Personnel 

Orup — vocals, guitar, bass
Rikard Nilsson — piano, organ
Andreas Dahlbäck — drums
Peter Kvint — bass, guitar, synthesizer, piano, steel guitar, percussion, producer

Charts

Weekly charts

Year-end charts

References

External links 

 

2010 albums
Orup albums
Roxy Recordings albums